William M. Anderson (born 12 March 1948) is an Irish film editor who was nominated for the BAFTA Award for Best Editing for the film Dead Poets Society (1989). He has had an extended, notable association with the director Peter Weir, beginning with the film Gallipoli (1981), including Dead Poets Society, and continuing through The Truman Show (1998). Lee Smith co-edited The Truman Show, and was sole editor on Weir's next film, Master and Commander: The Far Side of the World (2003). Anderson was born in Belfast, Northern Ireland.

Filmography
Based on the Internet Movie Database; the director and any co-editors for each film are indicated in parenthesis.
Cindy and Donna (Anderson – 1970)
The Young Graduates (Anderson – 1971)
The Adventures of Barry McKenzie (Beresford – 1972)
Barry McKenzie Holds His Own (Beresford – 1974)
Aaron Loves Angela (Parks, Jr. – 1975)
Don's Party (Beresford – 1976)
The Understudy (Luithle – 1976)
The Getting of Wisdom (Beresford – 1977)
5 Weeks in a Balloon (Cuddington – 1977)
Money Movers (Beresford – 1978)
Breaker Morant (Beresford – 1980)
The Club (Beresford – 1980)
Gallipoli (Weir – 1981)
Puberty Blues (Beresford – 1981)
The Year of Living Dangerously (Weir – 1982)
Tender Mercies (Beresford – 1983)
Razorback (Mulcahy – 1984)
Stanley (Storm – 1984)
King David (Beresford – 1985)
A Time to Live (Wallace – 1985)
Big Shots (Mandel – 1987)
Ollie Hopnoodle's Haven of Bliss (Bartlett – 1988)
1969 (Thompson – 1988)
Dead Poets Society (Weir – 1989)
Old Gringo (Puenzo – 1989; with Glenn Farr and Juan Carlos Macías)
A Shock to the System (Egleson – 1990; with Peter C. Frank)
RoboCop 2 (Kershner – 1990; supervising editor)
Green Card (Weir – 1990)
At Play in the Fields of the Lord (Babenco – 1991; with Armen Minasian)
Turtle Beach (Wallace – 1992; supervising editor)
1492: Conquest of Paradise (Scott – 1992; with Armen Minasian)
Fearless (Weir – 1993; with Armen Minasian and Lee Smith)
City Slickers II: The Legend of Curly's Gold (Weiland – 1994; with Armen Minasian)
Just Cause (Glimcher – 1995; with Armen Minasian)
Down Periscope (Ward – 1996; with Armen Minasian)
The Truman Show (Weir – 1998; with Lee Smith)
Ordinary Decent Criminal (O'Sullivan – 2000)
Igby Goes Down (Steers – 2002; with Robert Frazen and Padraic McKinley)
If Only (Junger – 2004; with Padraic McKinley)
Aegis (Sakamoto – 2005)
.45 (Lennon – 2006; with Richard Nord)
Say It in Russian (Celentano – 2007; with David Rawlins)
Midnight Eagle (Narushima – 2007)
Assassination of a High School President (Simon – 2008; with Thomas J. Nordberg)
While She Was Out (Montford – 2008)

See also
List of film director and editor collaborations

External links
 

1948 births
Living people
Artists from Belfast
British film editors
Film directors from Northern Ireland